Cole Matthew Custer (born January 23, 1998) is an American professional stock car racing driver. He competes full-time in the NASCAR Xfinity Series, driving the No. 00 Ford Mustang for Stewart-Haas Racing. He previously drove for SHR full-time in the NASCAR Cup Series from 2020 to 2022. He is the son of Joe Custer, the team president of Stewart-Haas Racing.

Racing career

Early career
Custer began racing quarter midgets at age four. In 2011, Custer won the USAC National Focus Young Guns Championship. The following year, Custer began racing late models, winning ten races and earning Rookie of the Year honors.

In 2013 Custer joined the K&N Pro Series East, making his debut at Bristol Motor Speedway for Ken Schrader Racing. During the season at Iowa Speedway, Custer won the pole position, led every lap, a record for a combination race, and won, becoming the youngest race winner in K&N Pro Series history at age 15, beating Dylan Kwasniewski's record by six months. Custer would win again at New Hampshire Motor Speedway, also from the pole. He finished eighth in the series standings. Custer later ran in the K&N Pro Series West's season-ending race. Custer led every single lap, but was turned by Gray Gaulding on the final lap, and finished sixth.

In the 2014 season, Custer won the Pro Series West opener at Phoenix International Raceway, holding off Greg Pursley and Brennan Newberry on the green–white–checker finish.

2014–2016: Camping World Truck Series

In 2014, Custer joined Haas Racing Development to run nine races in the NASCAR Camping World Truck Series, making his debut in the Kroger 250 at Martinsville Speedway. Custer started the race 9th, and finished 12th. In qualifying for the Drivin' for Linemen 200 at Gateway Motorsports Park, Custer set the track record with a  lap speed, becoming the youngest pole winner in NASCAR history.

At New Hampshire Motor Speedway on September 20, 2014, Custer won the Camping World Truck Series' UNOH 175 from the pole, becoming the youngest winner in the history of NASCAR's national touring series at 16 years, 7 months and 28 days.

On January 12, 2015, JR Motorsports announced that Custer would drive a truck for them in ten races in 2015. On June 13, Custer won the Truck race at Gateway Motorsports Park, holding off the No. 23 truck of Spencer Gallagher, after the dominating trucks of Erik Jones and Matt Crafton were involved in two wrecks at laps 142 and 152.

When he turned 18 years old in 2016, JR Motorsports began fielding the No. 00 truck for Custer full-time, competing for the Rookie of the Year title. At Canadian Tire Motorsport Park during the Chevrolet Silverado 250, John Hunter Nemechek and Custer were battling for the lead when Nemechek bumped Custer before running both Custer and himself off-road, pinning Custer to the wall. Before the winner was declared, Nemechek was tackled by Custer; Nemechek would be named the winner.

2017–2019: Xfinity Series

In 2016, Custer made his Xfinity Series debut for JR Motorsports at Richmond International Raceway, driving the No. 5 Chevrolet Camaro. He drove the No. 88 for JR Motorsports to a career best fourth-place finish at Charlotte in the Hisense 4K TV 300.

On September 16, 2016, Stewart-Haas Racing announced that Custer would drive the No. 00 Ford Mustang full-time in 2017, with Haas Automation as the primary sponsor.  Custer began the 2017 Xfinity season with a crash at Daytona, finishing 37th.  He rebounded the next week at Atlanta, finishing 10th.

After making the Playoffs in his first appearance, Custer began making a surge at the end of the season including leading the most laps at Chicago and Kansas. Custer missed the Final Four by two spots after racing head to head with Daniel Hemric, the next week, Custer put on a clinic by leading the most laps, winning both stages and en route to his first Xfinity win at the Homestead–Miami Speedway in South Florida. The next year at the fall Texas race, Custer got his second career win when he passed Tyler Reddick on the last lap, clinching his spot in the Championship Four.

In the 2019 season, Custer scored wins at Fontana, Richmond, Pocono, Chicago, Kentucky, and Dover. He finished second at Darlington,  but was declared the official race winner after Denny Hamlin was disqualified when his car failed to meet height requirements during post-race inspection. At the end of the Kansas race, Custer got into a fight with Reddick on pit road. Custer finished the 2019 season second in points after finishing second again to Reddick at Homestead.

2020–2022: Cup Series

In March 2018, Custer joined Rick Ware Racing for his Monster Energy NASCAR Cup Series debut in the Pennzoil 400 at Las Vegas Motor Speedway. He finished 25th. He returned for the June Pocono race where he would finish 26th. At Richmond Raceway in the fall, he qualified a surprising tenth, though he would go on to finish 26th.

On November 15, 2019, Stewart-Haas Racing announced that Custer will replace Daniel Suárez in the No. 41 Ford in 2020. He scored his first Cup top-ten finish at Phoenix, while his maiden top five came at Indianapolis.

A week after Indianapolis, Custer won his first Cup race in the Quaker State 400 at Kentucky Speedway, passing Kevin Harvick, Martin Truex Jr., and Ryan Blaney on the last lap. He became the first rookie to win in the Cup Series since Chris Buescher in 2016, the first rookie to do so in a non-shortened race since Juan Pablo Montoya in 2007, and the 33rd driver to win a race in all three NASCAR national touring series. With the win, Custer made the 2020 Playoffs, but was eliminated following the third round at Bristol. He finished 16th in the points standings and was awarded the Sunoco Rookie of the Year honors. Custer remained with Stewart-Haas for the 2021 season. However, his results were inconsistent and he missed the playoffs after the regular-season finale at Daytona as he was 26th in the points standings with just two top tens at Talladega and Dover.

After a two-year absence, Custer returned to the Xfinity Series in May 2021 at Circuit of the Americas, driving the No. 17 for SS-Green Light Racing and Rick Ware Racing in a collaboration with Stewart-Haas Racing.

Custer returned to Xfinity Series competition in February 2022 at Auto Club Speedway, driving the No. 07 for SS-Green Light Racing in a collaboration with Stewart-Haas Racing. He would end up winning the race after leading 80 laps. It was his 10th career Xfinity Series win, and the first win for SS-Green Light Racing.

On October 11, 2022, Custer and crew chief Mike Shiplett were fined 100,000 after Custer intentionally slowed down and checked up on the last lap of the Charlotte Roval race, allowing his SHR teammate Chase Briscoe to advance to the next round of the playoffs. In addition, Shiplett was indefinitely suspended and the No. 41 team was docked 50 owner and driver points.

2023–present: Back to the Xfinity Series

On November 16, 2022, SHR announced that Ryan Preece would replace Custer in the No. 41 in the Cup Series in 2023 while Custer would move back to the Xfinity Series, driving a second full-time car for SHR. The team announced on November 23, 2022 that he would drive the 00 once again.

Personal life
Born in Ladera Ranch, California, Custer is the son of Joe Custer, who is the team president of Stewart-Haas Racing and the chief operating officer of Haas F1 Team. SHR co-owner Gene Haas' company, Haas Automation, sponsors Custer. He attended Ladera Ranch Middle School and Tesoro High School.

Motorsports career results

NASCAR
(key) (Bold – Pole position awarded by qualifying time. Italics – Pole position earned by points standings or practice time. * – Most laps led.)

Cup Series

Daytona 500

Xfinity Series

Camping World Truck Series

 Season still in progress
 Ineligible for series points

K&N Pro Series East

K&N Pro Series West

ARCA Racing Series
(key) (Bold – Pole position awarded by qualifying time. Italics – Pole position earned by points standings or practice time. * – Most laps led.)

References
Notes

Citations

External links
 
 

Living people
1998 births
Sportspeople from Orange County, California
Racing drivers from California
NASCAR drivers
JR Motorsports drivers
Stewart-Haas Racing drivers
Multimatic Motorsports drivers
Michelin Pilot Challenge drivers